The 2018 Big Sky Conference softball tournament was held at Wildcat Softball Field on the campus of the Weber State University in Ogden, UT from May 10 through May 12, 2018. The tournament winner earned the Big Sky Conference's automatic bid to the 2018 NCAA Division I softball tournament. This was the third straight year the tournament featured six teams. Thursday and Friday were streamed on Pluto TV with Mike Lageschulte on the call, while Saturday's championship aired on Eleven Sports. 

Rain postponements Friday caused alterations to the remainder of the schedule. Saturday's winner's bracket semifinal was instead made the championship match. The remainder of the consolation bracket was cancelled. The reason for cancelling the remaining matches was 1) Weber State softball doesn't have outdoor lighting, so games must be completed during daylight hours and 2) more rain was in the forecast Sunday which would have postponed the possible Sunday championship. If this had happened, the regular season champion would have gotten the NCAA auto-bid.

Tournament

All times listed are Mountain Daylight Time.

References

Big Sky Conference softball tournament
Big Sky